Ngima Gelu Sherpa is a writer, director and producer, known for Home.

References

External links 
 

1993 births
Living people
Nepalese film directors
People from Solukhumbu District
21st-century Nepalese screenwriters